The Idaho Democratic Party is the affiliate of the Democratic Party in the U.S. state of Idaho.

While the party has been in the minority for most of the state's history, it has produced several notable public figures, including former U.S. senator Frank Church and former governor and secretary of the interior Cecil Andrus. Trade union support has traditionally been a key component of Democratic success in Idaho.

History
Created in 1863 after the discovery of new mining territory, the early Idaho Territory was heavily populated by settlers from western Oregon, California and Nevada who supported a radical Republican agenda. However, towards the end of the war, Idaho became flooded with Confederate refugees from states like Missouri who voted, like the miners in Idaho, heavily Democratic. The state became a Democratic stronghold for the next two decades.

At the dawn of statehood, despite ceding Idaho almost entirely four years earlier to the Populists and Republicans (Cleveland won only 2 popular votes in 1892), a fusion Populist/Democratic ticket behind William Jennings Bryan's candidacy won the state with 78.1% of the vote with the support from Silver Republicans. Nevertheless, the three– man congressional delegation remained two-part Populist, one-part Republican.

It was not until the turn of the century that Idaho saw its first Democratic representation in Congress, Senator Fred Dubois, U.S. Marshal of the Idaho Territory and a former Republican. He successfully campaigned on the disenfranchisement of Mormons on the grounds that they broke the law by practicing polygamy, already having barred them form holding office while he held office in the state legislature. Ironically, while his anti– Mormonism as a Republican kept Democrats out of office after 1882, his anti-Mormonism as a Democrat had the same result after 1902.

Though Democrats and Jewish governor Moses Alexander were able to implement a radically progressive agenda with the backing of the Nonpartisan League while in control during Woodrow Wilson's presidency, they quickly ceded power and it was not until Franklin Delano Roosevelt's 1932 landslide that they began to turn out state and local (as well as national) Republican office holders for a sustained period of time. That year, all three congressional Republicans up for re– election were defeated by Democratic challengers by at least 11 percent. All three challengers, like their state party, were stalwart supporters of FDR's New Deal. Despite a turn of opinion against the federal government's programs years later, Democrats retained two of their three newly attained seats for at least 15 years and managed to control the legislature for eight until the chambers evened themselves out during and immediately after the war.

Decline
In the post-war decades, as state politics was professionalized, Republicans dominated the state legislature and the governor's mansion, but Democrats maintained a steadfast presence across all other executive offices. A platform of environmental concerns gave Idaho its last Democratic governor to date even as it became more conservative in its congressional delegation and state legislature. However, in the 1970s and 1980s, Democrats lost two key voting groups. After the national party adopted a host of liberal social issues like abortion rights and feminism, Idaho's Mormons left the party in droves. Meanwhile, unions lost influence in already declining mining and timber industries.

Since 1994, when four-term Democratic governor Cecil Andrus retired and Representative Larry LaRocco was defeated, only one member of the party, Walt Minnick, has won either statewide office or election to Congress; after winning election to the latter capacity in 2008, Minnick was subsequently defeated for re-election by Republican Raúl Labrador two years later. Idaho Democrats currently seat only twelve members of the state House and six members of the state Senate, slightly worse than the ~20% they held in each chamber in 1996 when the party first collapsed. Unlike with other Mountain West states, such as Nevada and Colorado, immigration has not shifted Idaho leftward. Rather, Californians and other West Coast residents who have moved there have done so largely for cultural instead of economic reasons.

Elected officials

Members of Congress
 None

Statewide offices
 None

Legislative leadership
 Senate Minority Leader: Melissa Wintrow
Assistant Senate Minority Leader: James Ruchti
Senate Minority Caucus Chair: Janie Ward– Engelking
 House Minority Leader: Ilana Rubel
Assistant House Minority Leader: Lauren Necochea
House Minority Caucus Chair: Ned Burns

Other 
Mayor of Boise: Lauren McLean

Chairs 
Lauren Necochea
Deborah Silver
Fred Cornworth
Evangeline "Van" Beechler
Bert Marley
Larry Kenck
R. Keith Roark
Larry Grant
Richard H. Stallings
Carolyn Boyce
Kathie Garrett
Bill Mauk
Mel Morgan
A. K. Lienhart– Minnick
Conley Ward, 1988– 1991
George Klein 1978
John F. Greenfield 1976– 77
A. W. "Bill" Brunt 1952– 1954
John G. Walters 1958
John Glasby
George A. Greenfield 1954– 1955
Gilbert Larsen ?– 1952
Ed P. Brennan 1949
Dan J. Cavanagh 1947– 1948
David L. Bush 1944– 1946
Ben W. Davis 1939
Ira H. Taylor 1937
T. A. Walters 1931
Edwin M. Holden 1930
L. E. Dillingham 1925– 1929
Dr. W. R. Hamilton ?– 1918
Joseph T. Pence 1914
Ben R. Gray 1912
John F. Nugent
Kirtland I. Perky 1900– 1902
George Ainslie 1890– 1891

Election results

Presidential

Gubernatorial

See also

 Political party strength in Idaho
 Idaho Democratic caucuses, 2016
 Idaho Democratic caucuses, 2012
 Idaho Democratic caucuses, 2008

References

External links
 Idaho Democratic Party

 
Democratic Party
Democratic Party (United States) by state